ECMA-23 is a standard for a bit-paired keyboard layout
adopted in 1969 and revised in 1975. As a bit-paired layout, shifted keys
correspond to toggling bits in the ASCII keycode.
This is most visible in the digits on the top row, where shifting

The ECMA-23 layout has two options, being the same as the ISO 2530 or the ANSI-X4.14 bit-paired layout.

In the UK, ECMA-23 layout keyboards were used on most 8-bit computers such as the
Acorn BBC computers and the earlier Atom and Systems, the Amstrad CPC series, and
(to an extent) the ZX Spectrum. While bit-paired layouts have generally given way
to typewriter layouts it remains as the Japanese keyboard layout.

Technical details

 The  and  keys may be at the left as per ISO2530 or at the right as per ANSI-X4.14.
 Character 96 is generated either with Shift- with  a singleton key, or with Shift- with  a singleton key.
 Underline may be generated with Shifted- instead of with its own key. If this is done then Shift- is used to generate character 96.
 If a key is labelled  it should be at the top-right; if a key is labelled  it should be at the bottom-right.
The most common layouts are:
 "BBC Micro": ECMA23/ANSI with Shift- generating character 96
 "Japan": ECMA23/ANSI with Shift- generating character 96 and an extra key to the right of  generating 
 "PC": ECMA23/ISO with Shift- generating character 96

Examples

Notes

External links
 Standard ECMA-23 for Keyboards

ASCII
Keyboard layouts